Henry "Flash" Turner (September 1, 1913 –  August 13, 2000) was an American baseball catcher in the Negro leagues. He played with the Jacksonville Red Caps/Cleveland Bears from 1937 to 1942 and the Cleveland Buckeyes in 1943.

Career
Turner broke into the major leagues of black baseball with the Jacksonville Red Caps in 1938. In 13 documented games, he batted .295. He remained with the club when they became the Cleveland Bears the following year and led the Negro American League in batting average with .393 in 23 recorded games played with 21 runs batted in. He played in 18 documented games the following year and batted .213 before the club returned to Jacksonville as the Red Caps, where he played 13 documented combined games over the next two years, collecting eight hits. He closed his career out with the Cleveland Buckeyes and batted .205 in 16 recorded games. He was released by Cleveland prior to the start of the 1944 season.

References

External links
 and Seamheads

Jacksonville Red Caps players
Cleveland Bears players
Cleveland Buckeyes players
1913 births
Year of death missing
Baseball players from Florida
Baseball catchers